Jean-Luc Marion (born 3 July 1946) is a French philosopher and Roman Catholic theologian. Marion is a former student of Jacques Derrida whose work is informed by patristic and mystical theology, phenomenology, and modern philosophy. Much of his academic work has dealt with Descartes and phenomenologists like Martin Heidegger and Edmund Husserl, but also religion. God Without Being, for example, is concerned predominantly with an analysis of idolatry, a theme strongly linked in Marion's work with love and the gift, which is a concept also explored at length by Derrida.

Biography

Early years

Marion was born in Meudon, Hauts-de-Seine, on 3 July 1946. He studied at the University of Nanterre (now the University Paris Ouest Nanterre La Défense) and the Sorbonne and then did graduate work in philosophy from the École normale supérieure in Paris from 1967 to 1971, where he was taught by Jacques Derrida, Louis Althusser and Gilles Deleuze. At the same time, Marion's deep interest in theology was privately cultivated under the personal influence of theologians such as Louis Bouyer, Jean Daniélou, Henri de Lubac, and Hans Urs von Balthasar.  From 1972 to 1980 he studied for his doctorate and worked as an assistant lecturer at the Sorbonne. After receiving his doctorate in 1980, he began teaching at the University of Poitiers.

Career
From there he moved to become the Director of Philosophy at the University Paris X – Nanterre, and in 1991 also took up the role of professeur invité at the Institut Catholique de Paris. In 1996 he became Director of Philosophy at the University of Paris IV (Sorbonne), where he still teaches.

Marion became a visiting professor at the University of Chicago Divinity School in 1994.  He was then appointed the John Nuveen Professor of the Philosophy of Religion and Theology there in 2004, a position he held until 2010. That year, he was appointed the Andrew Thomas Greeley and Grace McNichols Greeley Professor of Catholic Studies at the Divinity School, a position that had been vacated by the retirement of theologian David Tracy. He retired from Chicago in 2022.

On 6 November 2008, Marion was elected as an immortel by the Académie Française. Marion now occupies seat 4, an office previously held by Cardinal Lustiger.

Awards
His awards include:
 the Premio Joseph Ratzinger of the Fondazione Vaticana Joseph Ratzinger – Benedetto XVI (initially 2020 but received in 2021 Due to the covid-19 pandemic) 
 the Karl Jaspers Prize of the city and University of Heidelberg (2008).
 the Grand Prix de philosophie de l'Académie française (1992), for his entire oeuvre
 the Prix Charles Lambert de l'Académie des sciences morales et politiques (1977)

Philosophy

Marion's phenomenological work is set out in three volumes which together form a triptych or trilogy. Réduction et donation: Etudes sur Husserl, Heidegger et la phénoménologie (1989) is an historical study of the phenomenological method followed by Husserl and Heidegger, with a view towards suggesting future directions for phenomenological research. The unexpected reaction that Réduction et donation provoked called for clarification and full development. This was addressed in Étant donné: Essai d'une phénoménologie de la donation (1997), a more conceptual work investigating phenomenological givenness, the saturated phenomenon and the gifted—a rethinking of the subject. Du surcroît (2001) provides an in-depth description of saturated phenomena.

Givenness
Marion claims that he has attempted to "radically reduce the whole phenomenological project beginning with the primacy in it of givenness". What he describes as his one and only theme is the givenness that is required before phenomena can show themselves in consciousness—"what shows itself first gives itself. This is based on the argument that any and all attempts to lead phenomena back to immanence in consciousness, that is, to exercise the phenomenological reduction, necessarily results in showing that givenness is the "sole horizon of phenomena"

Marion radicalizes this argument in the formulation, "As much reduction, as much givenness", and offers this as a new first principle of phenomenology, building on and challenging prior formulae of Husserl and Heidegger. The formulation common to both, Marion argues, "So much appearance, so much Being", adopted from Johann Friedrich Herbart, erroneously elevates appearing to the status of the "sole face of Being". In doing so, it leaves appearing itself undetermined, not subject to the reduction, and thus in a "typically metaphysical situation".

The Husserlian formulation, "To the things themselves!", is criticized on the basis that the things in question would remain what they are even without appearing to a subject—again circumventing the reduction or even without becoming phenomena. Appearing becomes merely a mode of access to objects, rendering the formulation inadequate as a first principle of phenomenology. A third formulation, Husserl's "Principle of all Principles", states "that every primordial dator Intuition is a source of authority (Rechtsquelle) for knowledge, that whatever presents itself in intuition...is simply to be accepted as it gives itself out to be, though only within the limits in which it then presents itself." Marion argues that while the Principle of all Principles places givenness as phenomenality's criterion and achievement, givenness still remains uninterrogated. Whereas it admits limits to intuition ("as it gives itself..., though only within the limits in which it presents itself"), "givenness alone is absolute, free and without condition"

Givenness then is not reducible except to itself, and so is freed from the limits of any other authority, including intuition; a reduced given is either given or not given. "As much reduction, as much givenness" states that givenness is what the reduction accomplishes, and any reduced given is reduced to givenness. The more a phenomenon is reduced, the more it is given. Marion calls the formulation the last principle, equal to the first, that of the appearing itself.

By describing the structures of phenomena from the basis of givenness, Marion claims to have succeeded in describing certain phenomena that previous metaphysical and phenomenological approaches either ignore or exclude—givens that show themselves but which a thinking that does not go back to the given is powerless to receive. In all, three types of phenomena can be shown, according to the proportionality between what is given in intuition and what is intended:

Phenomena where little or nothing is given in intuition. Examples include the Nothing and death, mathematics and logic. Marion claims that metaphysics, in particular Kant (but also Husserl), privileges this type of phenomenon.
Phenomena where there is adequation between what is given in intuition and what is intended. This includes any objective phenomena.
Phenomena where what is given in intuition fills or surpasses intentionality. These are named saturated phenomena.

The saturated phenomenon
Marion defines "saturated phenomena," which contradicts the Kantian claim that phenomena can only occur if they are congruent with the a priori knowledge upon which an observer's cognitive function is founded. For example, Kant would claim that the phenomenon "three years is a longer period of time than four years" cannot occur.

According to Marion, "saturated phenomena" (such as divine revelation) overwhelm the observer with their complete and perfect givenness, such that they are not shaped by the particulars of the observer's cognition at all. These phenomena may be conventionally impossible, and still occur because their givenness saturates the cognitive architecture innate to the observer.

"The Intentionality of Love"
The fourth section of Marion's work Prolegomena to Charity is entitled "The Intentionality of Love" and primarily concerns intentionality and phenomenology.  Influenced by (and dedicated to) the French philosopher Emmanuel Levinas, Marion explores the human idea of love and its lack of definition: "We live with love as if we knew what it was about. But as soon as we try to define it, or at least approach it with concepts, it draws away from us." He begins by explaining the essence of consciousness and its "lived experiences." Paradoxically, the consciousness concerns itself with objects transcendent and exterior to itself, objects irreducible to consciousness, but can only comprehend its 'interpretation' of the object; the reality of the object arises from consciousness alone.  Thus the problem with love is that to love another is to love one's own idea of another, or the "lived experiences" that arise in the consciousness from the "chance cause" of another: "I must, then, name this love my love, since it would not fascinate me as my idol if, first, it did not render to me, like an unseen mirror, the image of myself. Love, loved for itself, inevitably ends as self-love, in the phenomenological figure of self-idolatry." Marion believes intentionality is the solution to this problem, and explores the difference between the I  who intentionally sees objects and the me who is intentionally seen by a counter-consciousness, another, whether the me likes it or not.  Marion defines another by its invisibility; one can see objects through intentionality, but in the invisibility of the other, one is seen.  Marion explains this invisibility using the pupil: "Even for a gaze aiming objectively, the pupil remains a living refutation of objectivity, an irremediable denial of the object; here for the first time, in the very midst of the visible, there is nothing to see, except an invisible and untargetable void...my gaze, for the first time, sees an invisible gaze that sees it." Love, then, when freed from intentionality, is the weight of this other's invisible gaze upon one's own, the cross of one's own gaze and the other's and the "unsubstitutability" of the  other.  Love is to "render oneself there in an unconditional surrender...no other gaze must respond to the ecstasy of this particular other exposed in his gaze." Perhaps in allusion to a theological argument, Marion concludes that this type of surrender "requires faith."

Publications
God Without Being, University of Chicago Press, 1991. [Dieu sans l'être; Hors-texte, Paris: Librarie Arthème Fayard, (1982)]
Reduction and Givenness: Investigations of Husserl, Heidegger and Phenomenology, Northwestern University Press, 1998. [Réduction et donation: recherches sue Husserl, Heidegger et la phénoménologie, (Paris: Presses Universitaires de France, 1989)]
Cartesian Questions: Method and Metaphysics, University of Chicago Press, 1999. [Questions cartésiennes I: Méthode et métaphysique, (Paris: Presses Universitaires de France, 1991)]
 'In the Name: How to Avoid Speaking of 'Negative Theology', in JD Caputo and MJ Scanlon, eds, God, the Gift and Postmodernism, (Bloomington, IN: Indiana University Press, 1999)
On Descartes' Metaphysical Prism: The Constitution and the Limits of Onto-theo-logy in Cartesian Thought, University of Chicago Press, 1999. [Sur le prisme métaphysique de Descartes. (Paris: Presses Universitaires de France, 1986)]
The Idol and Distance: Five Studies, Fordham University Press, 2001. [L'idole et la distance: cinq études, (Paris: B Grasset, 1977)]
Being Given: Toward a Phenomenology of Givenness, Stanford University Press, 2002. [Étant donné. Essai d'une phénoménologie de la donation, (Paris: Presses Universitaires de France, 1997)]
In Excess: Studies of Saturated Phenomena, Fordham University Press, 2002. [De surcroit: études sur les phénomenes saturés, (Paris: Presses Universitaires de France, 2001)]
Prolegomena to Charity, Fordham University Press, 2002. [Prolégomènes á la charité, (Paris: E.L.A. La Différence, 1986]
The Crossing of the Visible, Stanford University Press, 2004. [La Croisée du visible, (Paris: Presses Universitaires de France, 1996)]
The Erotic Phenomenon: Six Meditations, University of Chicago Press, 2007. [Le phénomene érotique: Six méditations, (Paris: Grasset, 2003)]
On the Ego and on God, Fordham University Press, 2007. [Questions cartésiennes II: Sur l'ego et sur Dieu, (Paris: Presses Universitaires de France, 1996)]
The Visible and the Revealed, Fordham University Press, 2008. [Le visible et le révélé. (Paris: Les Éditions du Cerf, 2005)]
The Reason of the Gift (Richard Lectures), University of Virginia Press, 2011.
In the Self's Place: The Approach of St. Augustine, Stanford University Press, 2012. [Au lieu de soi, (Paris: Presses Universitaires de France, 2008)]
Givenness & Hermeneutics (Pere Marquette Lectures in Theology), Marquette University Press, 2013.
Negative Certainties, University of Chicago Press, 2015. [Certitudes négatives. (Paris: Editions Grasset & Fasquelle, 2009)]
Givenness and Revelation (Gifford Lectures), Oxford University Press, 2016.
Believing in Order to See: On the Rationality of Revelation and the Irrationality of Some Believers, Fordham University Press, 2017.
A Brief Apology for a Catholic Moment, University of Chicago Press, 2017. [Brève apologie pour un moment catholique, (Paris: Editions Grasset & Fasquelle, 2017)]
On Descartes' Passive Thought: The Myth of Cartesian Dualism, University of Chicago Press, 2018. [Sur la pensée de Descartes, (Paris: Presses Universitaires de France, 2013)]
Descartes' Grey Ontology: Cartesian Science and Aristotelian Thought in the Regulae, St. Augustine's Press, Forthcoming - May 2022.
Descartes' White Theology, Saint Augustine's Press, Translation in process.

See also
Christian existentialism
Postmodern Christianity
Rational mysticism

References

Sources

Further reading
Rethinking God as Gift: Marion, Derrida, and the Limits of Phenomenology, Robyn Horner, Fordham University Press, 2001
Givenness and God: Questions of Jean-Luc Marion, Ian Leask and Eoin G. Cassidy, eds., Fordham University Press, 2005
Counter-Experiences: Reading Jean-Luc Marion, edited by Kevin Hart, University of Notre Dame Press, 2007.

Reading Jean-Luc Marion:Exceeding Metaphysics, Christina M. Gschwandtner, Indiana University Press, 2007.
Interpreting Excess: Jean-Luc Marion, Saturated Phenomena, and Hermeneutics, Fordham University Press, 2010.
A Genealogy of Marion's Philosophy of Religion: Apparent Darkness, Tamsin Jones, Indiana University Press, 2011.
Degrees of Givenness: On Saturation in Jean-Luc Marion, Christina M. Gschwandtner, Indiana University Press, 2014.
Marion and Derrida on the Gift and Desire: Debating the Generosity of Things, Jason W. Alvis, Contributions to Phenomenology Series, Springer Press, 2016.

External links 

‘We Are Not Yet Christians’: An interview with Jean-Luc Marion by Kenneth L. Woodward. Archived from the original in 2021 December

1946 births
Living people
People from Meudon
Lycée Condorcet alumni
École Normale Supérieure alumni
Paris Nanterre University alumni
University of Chicago Divinity School faculty
Academic staff of the University of Paris
Academic staff of the University of Poitiers
French historians of philosophy
Catholic philosophers
Postmodernists
Phenomenologists
Christian continental philosophers and theologians
Descartes scholars
20th-century French philosophers
20th-century French Catholic theologians
21st-century French philosophers
21st-century French Catholic theologians
Members of the Académie Française
Chevaliers of the Légion d'honneur
Heidegger scholars
French male writers
Ratzinger Prize laureates